Eli Cohen (1924–1965) was an Israeli spy in Syria.

Eli Cohen may also refer to:
Eli Cohen (actor) (born 1940), Israeli film actor and director
Élie Cohen (conductor), French conductor
Eli Cohen (footballer, born 1951), Israeli football manager 
Eli Cohen (footballer, born 1961), Israeli football manager
Eli Cohen (politician born 1949), Israeli politician who served as a Knesset member for Likud
Eli Cohen (politician born 1972), Israeli politician who serves as a Knesset member for Likud and is currently Israel's Foreign Minister.
Elie Aron Cohen, Dutch doctor sent to the Auschwitz concentration camp